Sklenář (feminine: Sklenářová) is a Czech-language occupational surname, literally meaning glazier. Sklenár/Sklenárová are the Slovak-language versions and Szklenár is the Hungarian variant.

The surname may refer to:
Brandon Sklenar, American actor
Jakub Sklenář (disambiguation):
Jakub Sklenář (footballer) (born 1990), Czech footballer
Jakub Sklenář (ice hockey) (born 1988), Czech ice hockey player
Jason Sklenar (born 1970), British biathlete
Juraj Sklenár (1745–1790), Slovak historian and Catholic priest
Zdeněk Sklenář, Czechoslovak slalom canoeist
 (1844–1912), Czech actress

See also

Czech-language surnames
Slovak-language surnames